Jan Tore Amundsen (born 30 August 1968) is a retired Norwegian football midfielder.

From Rælingen, he joined Lillestrøm's junior setup and represented Norway as a youth international. On the road to Lillestrøm's 1986 Junior Norwegian Championship win, Amundsen scored three goals in Lillestrøm's 4-1 quarter-final victory over Start. Ahead of the 1987 season he was drafted into the senior squad, among others together with Jan Ove Pedersen and Roar Øien. 

Amundsen was unable to earn a regular spot in Lillestrøm's line-up and he quietly left the club. Along with Stein Amundsen, Bård Bjerkeland and Tom Sundby, he was one of four players who transferred to Lyn. From 1989 through 1992 he played for Lyn in Eliteserien and 1. divisjon. He went on to Drøbak-Frogn IL and Skjetten SK.

References

1968 births
Living people
People from Rælingen
Norwegian footballers
Lillestrøm SK players
Lyn Fotball players
Drøbak-Frogn IL players
Skjetten SK players
Eliteserien players
Norwegian First Division players
Association football midfielders
Norway youth international footballers